Herbert Binder (born 16 February 1932) is a Swiss sports shooter. He competed in the men's 50 metre free pistol event at the 1984 Summer Olympics.

References

1932 births
Living people
Swiss male sport shooters
Olympic shooters of Switzerland
Shooters at the 1984 Summer Olympics
Place of birth missing (living people)